The RS300 is a modern racing sailing dinghy made by RS Sailing. The RS300 is a one-design, single-handed, hiking dinghy  with a PY (Portsmouth Yardstick, RYA) of 972. Designed by Clive Everest and first produced in 1998, it is inspired by the International Moth, of which Everest was a successful designer.

Performance and design
There are two rigs for the boat. Rig A is slightly smaller than Rig B. The two sail sizes ensure that the power-to-weight ratio and handling characteristics are similar for both large and small sailors. In Yachts & Yachting magazine in the year 2000, the RS300 has been described as “…one of the most challenging and exciting dinghies I have ever sailed…”, as well as “…the first boat that I have sailed that is a joy just to sail around the course let alone race…” by Steve Cockerill, a renowned dinghy sailor who is past and present UK champion in many classes, including the RS300, Blaze & Laser Radial.

Awards
1998 - Won Small Sailing Boat of the Year Award at the British Nautical Awards.
2000 - Recognised as a 'Millennium Project' in the UK and was on display at the Millennium Dome.

External links
 RS Sailing (Global HQ)
 ISAF Connect to Sailing
 International RS Classes Association
 UK RS Association
 German RS Class Association

References

Dinghies
1990s sailboat type designs
Boats designed by Clive Everest
Sailboat types built by RS Sailing